Subdivision may refer to:

Arts and entertainment
 Subdivision (metre), in music
 Subdivision (film), 2009
 "Subdivision", an episode of Prison Break (season 2)
 Subdivisions (EP), by Sinch, 2005
 "Subdivisions" (song), by Rush, 1982

Science, technology and mathematics
 Subdivision (rank), a taxonomic rank
 Subdivision (botany), or subphylum, a taxonomic rank 
 Subdivision, resulting in Homeomorphism (graph theory)
 Subdivision surface, in computer graphics

Other uses
 Subdivision, an administrative division, a portion of a country
 Subdivision (India), an administrative division in India
 Subdivision (land), the act of dividing land into smaller pieces

See also
 
 
 Division (disambiguation)